The following is a list of sports venues in Portland, Oregon, specifically the metro area, that are currently in operation or defunct. The city features two major sports franchises, the Portland Timbers of Major League Soccer (MLS) and the Portland Trail Blazers of the National Basketball Association (NBA). The Portland Winterhawks, who are major junior ice hockey franchise in the Western Hockey League, have played in the city since 1976 when the Edmonton Oil Kings were relocated. They are a unique team in that they have two venues, the Moda Center and the Veterans Memorial Coliseum. Providence Park, a 25,218, seat open-air stadium which is the home of the Timbers, is the largest non-auto sports venue in Portland. The Moda Center, formerly the Rose Garden, is second with 19,980 seats for basketball games and slightly less for hockey match-ups. Portland International Raceway in Hayden Meadows has the largest seating capacity (30,000) of any sporting venue in Portland. There are several golf courses in the Portland metro area, including the Portland Golf Club where the 1946 PGA Championship was held.

Besides professional sports franchises, the Portland metro area is home to several colleges and universities athletic programs. Two of those schools, the Portland State Vikings and the University of Portland Pilots are NCAA Division I classified. The Vikings basketball programs play at 2,000 seat Peter Stott Center in Downtown Portland while the Pilots basketball teams play at their 4,852 seat domed stadium the Chiles Center in University Park. The Portland State football team shares Providence Park with the professional soccer teams the Portland Timbers, the Portland Timbers U23s and the Portland Thorns FC. The NAIA Concordia University Cavaliers have the one of the newest sports venues in Portland, Hilken Community Stadium, which is home to several of their athletic programs as well as Special Olympics Oregon and a local soccer club. The Stoffer Family Stadium in Newberg, where the George Fox University Bruins football team play, was opened in 2014. The Lewis & Clark Pioneers men's and women's tennis team have a unique facility, the Lewis & Clark Tennis Dome, which is an inflatable tent with translucent fabric on the ceiling for a skylight effect.

Some sports venues were converted for other uses like the Jantzen Beach Arena, and indoor ice rink and boxing venue which was leased to Toys "R" Us in 1980. Other venues like the First Regiment Armory Annex and the Vanport Extension Gymnasium had been converted into venues for sports after being used for other purposes. The Vanport Extension Gymnasium was built as a barrack during World War II but was sold to the State of Oregon who formed Vanport Extension College. The site was flooded in 1948 destroying the gymnasium. Reed Gymnasium II was also a converted barrack that was sold to Reed College following World War II.  It replaced Reed Gymnasium I which was built in 1914, four years after the founding of the institution. Columbia Gymnasium was a large wood building which had a seating capacity of 1,600 built for Columbia University in 1903. It was a unique building for its time in that it served as a baseball and football field in bad weather for the Columbia Cliffdwellers sports team. It was demolished after Howard Hall was completed in 1928 which was a 2,500 seat basketball and volleyball court attached to an indoor swimming pool. While Howard Hall still stands on the campus of the now-named University of Portland it no longer serves as the home to any athletic games the Chiles Center was complete in 1985.

Key

Table

Current venues

Defunct venues

Notes

 The Columbia University football and baseball teams used Columbia Gymnasium in bad weather. 
 Jantzen Beach Arena was sold to the owners of the Jantzen Beach Shopping Center in 1975 who leased it to Toys "R" Us in 1980. The building was converted into a storefront and the "closed" date refers to when it ceased operations as a sports venue.
 Before Vanport Extension College, the buildings were built for World War II purposes. The "opened" date indicates when the facility was used for sports.  After the Vanport Flood in 1948, the gymnasium was destroyed by water damage.

References

Portland
Hillsboro
Portland, Oregon
Sports venues in Portland
venues
Sports venues